The following television stations broadcast on digital channel 24 in the United States:

 K24AG-D in Trapper Creek, Alaska
 K24BY-D in Pahrump, Nevada
 K24CH-D in Cortez, etc., Colorado
 K24CT-D in Alamogordo, New Mexico
 K24CY-D in St. George, Utah, on virtual channel 14, which rebroadcasts KJZZ-TV
 K24DD-D in Plevna, Montana
 K24DK-D in Bullhead City, Arizona
 K24DT-D in Aberdeen, South Dakota
 K24EY-D in Walker Lake, Nevada
 K24EZ-D in Idalia, Colorado, on virtual channel 20, which rebroadcasts KTVD
 K24FE-D in Beaver, etc., Utah
 K24FF-D in Lovelock, Nevada
 K24FH-D in Glide, etc., Oregon
 K24FL-D in Columbus, Montana
 K24FU-D in Pleasant Valley, Colorado, on virtual channel 51, which rebroadcasts K16NJ-D
 K24GD-D in Hardin, Montana
 K24GE-D in Wells, Nevada
 K24GO-D in Blair, Nebraska
 K24GT-D in Kemmerer, Wyoming
 K24GY-D in Ely, Nevada
 K24HG-D in Cozad, Nebraska
 K24HH-D in Wichita Falls, Texas
 K24HP-D in Price, etc., Utah
 K24HQ-D in Boulder, Colorado, on virtual channel 6, which rebroadcasts KRMA-TV
 K24HU-D in Burley, etc., Idaho
 K24IB-D in Verdi/Mogul, Nevada
 K24ID-D in Ferndale, Montana
 K24IM-D in Keosauqua, Iowa
 K24IN-D in Green River, Utah
 K24IP-D in Huntington, Utah
 K24IT-D in Hoquiam, Washington, on virtual channel 5, which rebroadcasts K05RG-D
 K24IV-D in Farmington, New Mexico
 K24IX-D in Turkey, Texas
 K24IY-D in Raton, New Mexico
 K24JE-D in Sunriver, Oregon
 K24JG-D in Norfolk, Nebraska
 K24JL-D in Beowowe, Nevada
 K24JN-D in Lewiston, Idaho
 K24JO-D in Crawford, Colorado
 K24JV-D in St. James, Minnesota
 K24KG-D in Madras, Oregon
 K24KJ-D in Libby, Montana
 K24KM-D in Colstrip, etc., Montana
 K24KR-D in Jacks Cabin, Colorado, on virtual channel 2, which rebroadcasts K09TH-D
 K24KS-D in Flagstaff, Arizona, on virtual channel 15, which rebroadcasts KNXV-TV
 K24KT-D in Walker, Minnesota, on virtual channel 24, which rebroadcasts KARE
 K24KU-D in Chinook, Montana
 K24KV-D in Logan, Utah, on virtual channel 24
 K24KX-D in Cedarville, California
 K24LM-D in Bridgeport, Washington
 K24LQ-D in Collbran, Colorado
 K24LS-D in Lucerne Valley, California, on virtual channel 24
 K24MB-D in Hobbs, New Mexico
 K24MC-D in Baker Valley, Oregon
 K24MD-D in Sayre, Oklahoma
 K24MF-D in Florence, Oregon
 K24MH-D in Powers, Oregon
 K24MI-D in Redding, California
 K24MJ-D in Shoshoni, Wyoming
 K24MK-D in Glenrock, Wyoming
 K24ML-D in Taos, New Mexico
 K24MO-D in Tyler, Texas
 K24MP-D in Butte, Montana
 K24MQ-D in Marysvale, Utah
 K24MS-D in Roseau, Minnesota
 K24MU-D in Summit County, Utah
 K24MV-D in Fort Peck, Montana
 K24MW-D in Clovis, New Mexico
 K24MX-D in Deming, New Mexico
 K24MY-D in Kanarraville, Utah
 K24MZ-D in Fillmore, etc., Utah
 K24NA-D in Delta, Utah
 K24NB-D in Elko, Nevada
 K24NC-D in Roosevelt, Utah, on virtual channel 14, which rebroadcasts KJZZ-TV
 K24ND-D in Orangeville, Utah, on virtual channel 30, which rebroadcasts KUCW
 K24NE-D in Overton, Nevada
 K24NF-D in Tucumcari, New Mexico
 K24NG-D in Lake Havasu City, Arizona
 K24NH-D in Durango, Colorado
 K24NI-D in Yuma, Arizona
 K24NK-D in Memphis, Texas
 K24NM-D in Sargents, Colorado
 K24NO-D in Bonners Ferry, Idaho
 K24NQ-D in Golconda, Nevada
 K24NR-D in Amarillo, Texas
 K24NS-D in Stateline, Nevada
 K24NZ-D in Carbondale, Colorado
 K24OJ-D in Uvalde, Texas
 K44JP-D in Cottage Grove, Oregon
 K46BX-D in Phillips County, Montana
 K47MF-D in Orderville, Utah
 K47MY-D in Red Lake, Minnesota, on virtual channel 13, which rebroadcasts WIRT-DT
 K49BU-D in International Falls, Minnesota
 K51DF-D in Milton-Freewater, Oregon
 KAAP-LD in Santa Cruz, California, on virtual channel 24
 KAGW-CD in Wichita, Kansas
 KATU in Portland, Oregon, on virtual channel 2
 KBID-LP in Fresno, California
 KBIT-LD in Monterey, California
 KBNT-CD in San Diego, California, on virtual channel 17
 KCCX-LD in Corpus Christi, Texas
 KCSD-TV in Sioux Falls, South Dakota
 KCTV in Kansas City, Missouri, on virtual channel 5
 KCWL-LD in Monroe, Louisiana
 KDSO-LD in Medford, Oregon
 KEGS-LD in Las Vegas, Nevada
 KEGW-CD in Siloam Springs, Arkansas
 KEOO-LD in Midland, Texas
 KETH-TV in Houston, Texas, on virtual channel 14
 KFAM-CD in Lake Charles, Louisiana
 KFSM-TV in Van Buren, Arkansas
 KGMV in Wailuku, Hawaii
 KIAT-LD in Jonesboro, Arkansas
 KILM in Inglewood, California, uses KPXN-TV's spectrum, on virtual channel 64
 KIMT in Mason City, Iowa
 KIVI-TV in Nampa, Idaho
 KKFX-CD in San Luis Obispo, California
 KKTF-LD in Chico, California
 KMAX-TV in Sacramento, California, on virtual channel 31
 KMLN-LD in Fort Collins, Colorado, on virtual channel 23, which rebroadcasts KDEO-LD
 KMOV in St. Louis, Missouri, on virtual channel 4
 KNAT-TV in Albuquerque, New Mexico
 KNDM in Minot, North Dakota
 KOKH-TV in Oklahoma City, Oklahoma
 KPMF-LD in Paragould, Arkansas
 KPNZ in Ogden, Utah, on virtual channel 24
 KPXN-TV in San Bernardino, California, on virtual channel 30
 KQUP in Pullman, Washington
 KRDK-TV in Fargo/Valley City, North Dakota (as of 6/25/20) 
 KRDO-TV in Colorado Springs, Colorado
 KRLJ-LD in Joplin, Missouri
 KRPG-LD in Des Moines, Iowa
 KSAX in Alexandria, Minnesota, on virtual channel 42
 KSNB-TV in York, Nebraska
 KTTA-LD in Monroe, Utah, on virtual channel 8
 KTUL in McAlester, Oklahoma
 KTVK in Phoenix, Arizona, on virtual channel 3
 KTXU-LD in West Lake Hills, Texas
 KUNS-TV in Bellevue, Washington, an ATSC 3.0 station, on virtual channel 51
 KVEO-TV in Brownsville, Texas
 KVTN-DT in Pine Bluff, Arkansas
 KWEX-DT in San Antonio, Texas
 KXAS-TV in Fort Worth, Texas, on virtual channel 5
 KXIP-LD in Paris, Texas
 KXTQ-CD in Lubbock, Texas
 KYCW-LD in Branson, Missouri
 KZLL-LD in Joplin, Missouri
 KZSA-LD in San Angelo, Texas
 W24CL-D in Grantsburg, Wisconsin, on virtual channel 28, which rebroadcasts WHWC-TV
 W24CS-D in Reading, Pennsylvania, on virtual channel 69, which rebroadcasts WFMZ-AB
 W24DB-D in Clarks Summit, Pennsylvania
 W24DL-D in Saginaw, Michigan
 W24EC-D in Manteo, North Carolina
 W24ER-D in Clarksburg, West Virginia
 W24ES-D in Moorefield, West Virginia
 W24ET-D in Atlantic City, New Jersey
 W24EU-D in Erie, Pennsylvania
 W24EX-D in Florence, South Carolina
 W24EZ-D in Allingtown, Connecticut
 W24FB-D in Brazil, Indiana
 W24FC-D in Augusta, Georgia
 W39CA-D in Fulton, Mississippi
 WAMI-DT in Hollywood, Florida, on virtual channel 69
 WCML in Alpena, Michigan
 WCNC-TV in Charlotte, North Carolina, on virtual channel 36
 WDCO-CD in Woodstock, Virginia, on virtual channel 10
 WDDA-LD in Chattanooga, Tennessee
 WDEM-CD in Columbus, Ohio, on virtual channel 17
 WDLH-LD in Evansville, Indiana
 WDMW-LD in Milwaukee, Wisconsin
 WDPB in Seaford, Delaware
 WDSC-TV in New Smyrna Beach, Florida, on virtual channel 15
 WDWL in Bayamon, Puerto Rico, uses WUJA's spectrum, on virtual channel 36
 WEAO in Akron, Ohio, on virtual channel 49
 WETP-TV in Sneedville, Tennessee
 WFLD in Chicago, Illinois, on virtual channel 32
 WFMZ-AB in Allentown, Pennsylvania, on virtual channel 69, which rebroadcasts WFMZ-TV and WDPN-TV
 WGMB-TV in Baton Rouge, Louisiana
 WGTA in Toccoa, Georgia, on virtual channel 32
 WHIQ in Huntsville, Alabama
 WHOI in Peoria, Illinois
 WHRM-TV in Wausau, Wisconsin
 WHSV-TV (DRT) in Winchester, Virginia, on virtual channel 3
 WHTX-LD in Springfield, Massachusetts
 WIPL in Lewiston, Maine
 WITV in Charleston, South Carolina
 WJTS-CD in Jasper, Indiana
 WKON in Owenton, Kentucky
 WLNE-TV in New Bedford, Massachusetts
 WLWD-LD in Dayton, Ohio
 WMDN in Meridian, Mississippi
 WMDO-CD in Washington, D.C., uses WDCO-CD's spectrum, on virtual channel 47
 WNKY in Bowling Green, Kentucky
 WNPX-LD in Nashville, Tennessee
 WNYE-TV in New York, New York, on virtual channel 25
 WONO-CD in Syracuse, etc., New York
 WPDN-LD in Pittsburgh, Pennsylvania, on virtual channel 65
 WPHA-CD in Philadelphia, Pennsylvania, on virtual channel 24.
 WPTA in Fort Wayne, Indiana
 WPWR-TV in Gary, Indiana, uses WFLD's spectrum, on virtual channel 50
 WPXC-TV in Brunswick, Georgia
 WPXD-TV in Ann Arbor, Michigan, on virtual channel 31
 WPXI (DRT) in Uniontown, Pennsylvania, on virtual channel 11
 WPXJ-TV in Batavia, New York
 WQQZ-CD in Ponce, Puerto Rico, on virtual channel 14, which rebroadcasts WOST
 WRLH-TV in Richmond, Virginia
 WRLM in Canton, Ohio, uses WEAO's spectrum, on virtual channel 47
 WSRE in Pensacola, Florida
 WTAJ-TV in Altoona, Pennsylvania
 WTBM-CD in Birmingham, Alabama
 WTEN in Albany, New York
 WTLF in Tallahassee, Florida
 WTLJ in Muskegon, Michigan
 WUBX-CD in Durham, etc., North Carolina, on virtual channel 31
 WUDZ-LD in Indianapolis, Indiana, on virtual channel 28
 WUJA in Caguas, Puerto Rico, on virtual channel 58
 WUWT-CD in Union City, Tennessee
 WVAH-TV in Charleston, West Virginia
 WVNC-LD in Watertown, New York
 WVND-LD in Suwanee, Georgia, on virtual channel 31
 WWAY in Wilmington, North Carolina
 WWDD-LD in Havre De Grace, Maryland, on virtual channel 49
 WWEO-LD in Defuniak Springs, Florida
 WWSB in Sarasota, Florida, on virtual channel 40
 WXTX in Columbus, Georgia
 WYKE-CD in Inglis/Yankeetown, Florida
 WZCK-LD in Madison, Wisconsin

The following stations, which are no longer licensed, formerly broadcast on digital channel 24:
 K24CS-D in Granite Falls, Minnesota
 K24DA-D in Big Piney, etc., Wyoming
 K24IQ-D in Billings, Montana
 K24JI-D in Hermiston, Oregon
 K24JR-D in Orr, Minnesota
 K24KD-D in Salix, Iowa
 K24NL-D in Weed, California
 K24NN-D in Twin Falls, Idaho
 KIJK-LD in Lincoln, Nebraska
 KQFW-LD in Dallas, Texas
 KRUB-LD in Cedar Rapids, Iowa
 KXLJ-LD in Juneau, Alaska
 W24BB-D in East Stroudsburg, Pennsylvania
 W24DE-D in Miami, Florida
 W24DM-D in Gainesville, Florida
 W24DN-D in Clarksburg, West Virginia
 WLNN-CD in Boone, North Carolina
 WUEB-LD in Rockford, Illinois

References

24 digital